Norman Francis Wilkinson (16 February 1931 – 29 January 2011) was an English professional footballer. He started his career with non-League Crook Town before joining Football League team Hull City in 1953. He joined York City in 1954 and is the club's leading goalscorer with 143 goals. He returned to non-League with Annfield Plain after retiring from League football.

Career
Born in Alnwick, Northumberland, Wilkinson started his career playing in non-League football with Northern League side Crook Town, before joining Hull City of the Second Division as an amateur in November 1952. He made eight appearances and scored three goals in the Football League for Hull in the 1953–54 season. He joined Third Division North team York City for a signing on fee of £10 in May 1954. He scored two goals on his debut in the 6–2 victory against Wrexham on the opening day of the 1954–55 season. He was part of the team that reached the semi-final of the 1954–55 FA Cup, scoring against Scarborough, Dorchester Town and Tottenham Hotspur. Wilkinson is York's highest goalscorer with 143 goals in all competitions. He retired from League football in 1966 but continued on playing non-League football for Annfield Plain and also worked as a scout for York in the North East.

Personal life
During his career, Wilkinson played as a part-timer while also working as a shoe repairer and commuted from his home in north Durham. Before signing for Hull he served in the Royal Air Force. He died in his sleep at the age of seventy-nine on 29 January 2011.

Style of play
Wilkinson played as an inside forward.

Career statistics

References

1931 births
People from Alnwick
Footballers from Northumberland
2011 deaths
English footballers
Association football forwards
Crook Town A.F.C. players
Hull City A.F.C. players
York City F.C. players
Annfield Plain F.C. players
English Football League players